The Road of Dreams is a book of poetry by crime writer Agatha Christie. It was published at her own expense by Geoffrey Bles in January 1925 priced at five shillings (5/-). Only one edition of the 112-page volume was ever published and this was undated.

Christie wrote poetry for most of her life; her first traceable published works are three poems from 1919: World Hymn in The Poetry Review issue for March/April, Dark Sheila in Poetry Today issue for May/June and A Passing in the same journal for November/December. All three poems are reprinted in The Road of Dreams (with the first under the slightly amended title of World Hymn, 1914).

The book is divided into four sections:
 A Masque from Italy
 Ballads
 Dreams and Fantasies
 Other Poems

The final section includes a poem titled In a Dispensary which mentions many of the poisons that Christie would use in her long fictional career.

Literary response
The Times Literary Supplement in its issue of 26 February 1925 praised A Masque from Italy and other selected poems whilst stating that "her talent, however, is too delicate to turn a ballad convincingly" and World Hymn, 1914 was a "subject too large for her hand to grasp". It did conclude, however, by stating that in poems such as Beatrice Passes (from Dreams and Fantasies) her "real poetic gift is best displayed".

The Scotsman of 23 March 1925 said,

Forgotten creations
Christie does not mention the book in her autobiography. Her official biography recounts that Eden Phillpotts, a family friend, wrote to her and told her she "had great lyric gifts". He also warned her that it would not sell well, and was proven right when copies remained unbound and unsold well into the 1960s.

The contents of this book were reprinted in the 1973 collection Poems as "Volume 1", although there are several differences between the two editions (See Poems for details).

Publication history

 1925, Geoffrey Bles, Hardcover, January 1925, 112 pp, OCLC 12657447

References

External links
The Road of Dreams at the official Agatha Christie website

1925 poetry books
Poetry by Agatha Christie
English poetry collections
Geoffrey Bles books